Endeavorist is a science-oriented web application incorporating social networking, crowdfunding, and research collaboration services within a central "curiosity network".  The platform is designed to increase public accessibility to scientific endeavors and products thereof. The stated mission of Endeavorist is "to democratize the pursuit of knowledge and drive scientific endeavor through human curiosity."

Endeavorist is currently publicly available as an open beta. The planned duration of the open beta period is unknown.

History
Endeavorist, LLC was founded on April 24, 2012 in Fairfax Station, Virginia, a suburb in the Washington, D.C. metropolitan area. The website remained in closed development for over two years before becoming available to the public as an open beta, launched on April 26, 2014, at the USA Science and Engineering Festival.

See also
 Crowdfunding
 Open Science
 Basic Research

References

Companies based in Washington, D.C.
Internet properties established in 2012
Crowdfunding